The Lisbon Portugal Temple is a temple of the Church of Jesus Christ of Latter-day Saints (LDS Church) in the civil parish of Moscavide e Portela, in the Portuguese municipality of Loures. It is the first and only LDS temple constructed in Portugal.

History

The intent to construct a temple in the Portuguese capital was announced by church president Thomas S. Monson on 2 October 2010, during the church's semi-annual general conference.

On 22 October 2015 the church announced that the temple would be constructed in the Parque das Nações area of Lisbon, along Avenida Dom João II. A groundbreaking ceremony, to signify the beginning of construction, took place on 5 December 2015, with Patrick Kearon presiding. The groundbreaking was broadcast live to local church meetinghouses.

On 4 March 2019 the church announced a public open house to be held from 17 to 31 August 2019, excluding Sundays. On 29 August 2019 Marcelo Rebelo de Sousa, the president of the Portuguese Republic, visited the temple's open house.

The temple was dedicated on 15 September 2019 by Neil L. Andersen.

In 2020, like all the church's other temples, the Lisbon Portugal Temple was closed in response to the coronavirus pandemic.

See also

Comparison of temples of The Church of Jesus Christ of Latter-day Saints
List of temples of The Church of Jesus Christ of Latter-day Saints
List of temples of The Church of Jesus Christ of Latter-day Saints by geographic region
Temple architecture (Latter-day Saints)
The Church of Jesus Christ of Latter-day Saints in Portugal

References

External links
Lisbon Portugal Temple Official site
Lisbon Portugal Temple at ChurchofJesusChristTemples.org

21st-century Latter Day Saint temples
Religious buildings and structures in Lisbon
Temples (LDS Church) completed in 2019
Temples (LDS Church) in Europe
The Church of Jesus Christ of Latter-day Saints in Portugal
Christianity in Lisbon